Wan Guoquan (March 26, 1919 – March 23, 2017) was a Chinese male politician, who served as the vice chairperson of the Chinese People's Political Consultative Conference.

References 

1919 births
2017 deaths
Vice Chairpersons of the National Committee of the Chinese People's Political Consultative Conference